The Jeonju Lee Royal Family Association is a family association from South Korea, and it was founded by the Jeonju Yi  (Lee) clan, the household of Joseon and the Korean Empire, which were the ruling house of the whole Korea. The association originated from several national institutions of Joseon dynasty, and its recent main activities, after the World War II, include holding annual Jongmyo jerye, the worship rites of the royal ancestors, and compiling genealogy books of the descendants from the House of Yi.

History 
The king Taejo of Joseon started his reign in 1392, and some of the institution setups included an office to handle affairs regarding the royal family. The policy was continued by his son, Taejong of Joseon, who created the "Office of Royal Genealogy"(宗簿寺, 종부시) in 1401. The office existed for centuries, and a reformation was executed in 1864, during the reign of King Gojong. It was eventually abolished in 1907.

After the Japan–Korea Treaty of 1910, the former emperor Sunjong of Korea issued a decree, allowing the descendants of the royal family to form a private organization so as to strengthen the relationship within the clan. The said organization had a collection from Sunjong, a commemorative plaque with Sunjong's Chinese calligraphy handwriting on it, which reads 崇祖惇宗 (숭조돈종, "admire the ancestors and value the family"), but the plaque was later missing during the Korean War. On 27 November 1955, the members of the  Jeonju Lee Royal Family Association held a foundation ceremony in the hall of Whimoon Middle School in Seoul, and the association was later officially registered as a legal organization on 3 April 1957. The Association's headquarters are in the Ihwahoegwan building (이화회관 [李花會館], "Plum Blossom Hall"), located in Jongno District of Seoul, on the street leading to the main gate of Changdeokgung.

In addition to domestic offices, the association currently opens several branch offices internationally, including seven offices in North America and one in Japan.

Organization
According to the statistics in 1995, there were 2.8 million people coming from the Jeonju Yi clan in South Korea, making up over 770 thousand Yi families, 230 thousand families from whom lived in Seoul. Among them, there were nationwide 44% population from the clan (330 thousand families) that are registered members of the Jeonju Lee Royal Family Association; in Seoul, similarly, there were specifically 39% (90 thousand families) of the clan that were registered.

Within the association, there is a chairman, as the superior over vice-chairmen, supervisors, and members of the council; they are often family members with prominent figures in politics and/or economics. As various ways to support members from the clan, there are several sub-organizations, including one that can offer scholarship, committees for academics and art, as well as ones dedicated to ancestral worship activities. Based on different genealogy among family members, 83 groups of the member can be classified; based on the places of residence, there are 15 sub-associations and 225 offices set, and there are also, for further district subdivision, branches in smaller administrative units (myeon, eup, and dong). As to overseas sub-associations, there are ones in Japan (Kantō and Kansai offices) and the United States (including Chicago and Los Angeles offices).

List of directors

List of chairmen of the association

Notes

References

External links 

 Korean website: 전주이씨대동종약원
 English website: Jeonju Lee Royal Family Association

Jeonju Yi clan
Korean royalty
House of Yi
Joseon dynasty
Korean Empire
Organizations established in 1957
Family associations